Mamurras Stadium is a multi-use stadium in Mamurras, Albania. The stadium has a capacity of 1,000 people and it is mostly used for football matches and it is the home ground of KF Adriatiku Mamurrasi.

References

Football venues in Albania
Multi-purpose stadiums
Buildings and structures in Kurbin